Md. Afzal Hossain (Born: 9 January 1964) Bangladeshi businessman, lawyer and politician who is a Member of Parliament for Kishoreganj-5 constituency.

Early life
Md Afzal Hossain was born on 9 January 1964 in the village of Noapara Saserdighi in Bajitpur, Dhaka, Bangladesh. His father's name was Md. Abu Bakkar Siddique and his mother's name was Mosha: Rezia Khatun.He is married and has three daughters and one son.

Career
Afzal Hossain is a lawyer. He is the General Secretary of Dhaka Trade Center Shop Owners Association of Gulistan. He has been serving as the organizing secretary of the central committee of the Awami League since December 26, 2019. He was elected Member of Parliament from Kishoreganj-5 constituency on the nomination of Awami League in the Ninth Parliamentary Election of 2008. He was elected to Parliament on 5 January 2014 from Kishoreganj-5 as a Bangladesh Awami League candidate. He was re-elected as a Member of Parliament from the same constituency in the Eleventh Parliamentary Election of 2018.

References

Awami League politicians
Living people
1964 births
10th Jatiya Sangsad members
11th Jatiya Sangsad members
9th Jatiya Sangsad members